Munina  is a village in the administrative district of Gmina Jarosław, within Jarosław County, Subcarpathian Voivodeship, in south-eastern Poland,  east of Jarosław.

It is a railroad junction, situated on the main Kraków-Medyka line. Also, in Munina begins another connection, a branch line (pl) to Hrebenne.

References

Munina